Highway 70 is an East-West Highway in southern Jordan. It starts from Highway 15 and ends at Highway 35.

External links
Itinerary of the highway on Google Maps

Roads in Jordan